Sherpur is a village in Jalandhar district of Punjab State, India. It is located 7.4 km from Nurmahal, 24.8 km from Phillaur, 36.3 km from district headquarter Jalandhar and 135 km from state capital Chandigarh. The village is administrated by a sarpanch who is an elected representative of village as per Panchayati raj (India).

Transport  
jagraon railway station is the nearest train station however, jagraon station train station is 5  km away from the village. The village is near about 50  km away from domestic airport in Ludhiana and the nearest international airport is located in Chandigarh also Sri Guru Ram Dass Jee International Airport is the second nearest airportAmritsar.

References 

Villages in Ludhiana district